Bospoort Dam is a gravity/earth-fill type dam on the Hex River, a tributary of the Elands River, part of the Crocodile River (Limpopo) basin. It is located near Rustenburg, North West, South Africa. Its primary purpose is for irrigation.

History
It was established in 1933. It was originally the main water supply for the town of Rustenburg. In the sixties it was no longer used for drinking water due to contamination from platinum and chrome mines in the region. Due to water shortages in the nineties it was again used as the main water source for the Boitekong and surrounding townships. The fish in the dam are not fit for human consumption. The water in the dam in so corrosive that the steel sluices had to be replaced by a major rebuilding project in 2009 and 2010 for fear of the dam wall collapsing in a flood. The new dam structure was built from corrosion resistant compounds.

See also
List of reservoirs and dams in South Africa
List of rivers of South Africa

References 

Dams in South Africa
Crocodile River (Limpopo)
Dams completed in 1933